Starosultanbekovo (İśke Soltanbäk) is a rural locality (a selo) in Takarlikovsky Selsoviet, Dyurtyulinsky District, Bashkortostan, Russia. The population was 576 as of 2010. There are 12 streets.

Geography 
Starosultanbekovo is located 5 km southwest of Dyurtyuli (the district's administrative centre) by road. Dyurtyuli is the nearest rural locality.

References 

Rural localities in Dyurtyulinsky District